The 1997 Oldham Bears season was the 102nd season in the club's rugby league history and the second season in the Super League. The Oldham Bears competed in Super League II and finished bottom of the league in 12th place, relegating them to the Northern Ford Premiership. Following their relegation, the club went into liquidation in October 1997, with debts of over £1 million.

Table

Squad

References

External links
Oldham Rugby League Heritage Trust
Oldham Bears - Rugby League Project

Oldham Bears
Oldham R.L.F.C.
English rugby league club seasons